Georgian Film Studio (kartuli pilmi; ; Gruziya-Fil'm) is one of world's oldest film studios that has produced 800 features, made-for-TV and short films, 600 documentaries, and 300 animation movies. During Soviet times, the studio was one of the most active places for film production. Having grown organically from the merger of several film production companies that operated in the beginning of the twentieth century in Tbilisi, the studio had been renamed several times before becoming Georgian Film (Gruziya-Film in Russian) in 1953. Sitting on 9.75 hectares (24 acres) of prime land in Tbilisi, Georgian Film Studios offers several sound stages, recording and editing facilities, various production services, modern equipment and professional crews. Georgian Film was founded in 1921.

References

External links
English website
Catalogue of the studio's 207 animated films

Cinema of Georgia (country)
Film production companies of the Soviet Union
Film studios
Mass media companies established in 1921
1921 establishments in Georgia (country)